Mega Integrated Textile Region and Apparel scheme is announced by Government of India in 2021 to promote the industries manufacturing Textiles. The project is aimed for promoting Sustainable Development Goal 9 by United Nations. The scheme aims to integrate entire process of garment manufacturing  which includes spinning,weaving,dyeing or processing and printing at one place.

History 
Mega Integrated Textile Region and Apparel(MITRA) was announced in 2021 by Government of India to encourage the  Textile Industry. Shortlisted places in the states can set up Mega Integrated Textile Region and Apparel either at brownfield (which has been built on) sites or at greenfield (not earlier been built on) sites.

Different Parks 

Mega Integrated Textile Region and Apparel is planned to be set up in 7 places with planned expenditure of Rs 4,445 crores.

Benefits 

Mega Integrated Textile Region and Apparel will have following facilities-

  Development of large scale and modern industrial infrastructure facilities in an integrated system as a complete value-chain for the textile industry.
 Helpful in reducing cost for logistics.
 Makes Indian textile competitive.
 Increase employment opportunities.

See also 

 Textile Industry in India.

References

External links 
 Official Website

Textile industry of India